"It Must Be Love" is a song written and originally recorded and released in 1971 by English singer Labi Siffre on his 1972 album Crying Laughing Loving Lying. It was also recorded by ska/pop band Madness in 1981.

Labi Siffre original
The original Labi Siffre recording was released as a single in 1971, and reached Number 14 in January 1972 in the UK singles chart. It also appeared on his 1972 album Crying Laughing Loving Lying.

In 1994, a version of Siffre's original, with altered lyrics, was featured in an advertisement for Midland Bank. In 2007, it was featured in a UK TV advertisement for Vodafone.

Labi Siffre track listing
"It Must Be Love" – 3:42
"To Find Love" – 1:57

Charts

Madness version

Madness's version was originally issued as a standalone single in late-1981, reaching #4 on the UK singles chart, and appeared on their UK number one compilation album Complete Madness the following year, and on many other Madness compilations since. In 1983, it peaked in the US Billboard chart at #33.

In 2009, Madness's cover version was featured in an advertisement for LoveFilm. In 2012, it was featured in a US advertisement for Volkswagen Passat.

In 2012, Madness performed the song with Olly Murs at V Festival.

Music video
The video mostly shows band members playing in a white room and standing over a grave. It also features guitarist Chris Foreman and saxophonist Lee Thompson playing their instruments underwater. A killer whale is also seen. Foreman appears at the start of the video warning viewers not to attempt the "very dangerous stunt" they are about to see. Labi Siffre makes a cameo appearance as a violin player.

Madness's recording was reissued in 1992, and this time reached #6 in the UK chart. A slightly remixed version with a definite ending instead of the original fade-out, appeared on the 2002 compilation Our House: the Original Songs. In 2007, a remixed version of the Madness cover appeared in the German Edgar Wallace spoof movie Neues vom Wixxer, along with a new recording called "NW5". As well as the remix to the song, a new video was filmed, including three members of the band (Suggs, Chas Smash and Dan Woodgate) along with members of the cast.

Madness version track listing

1981 original issue
"It Must Be Love" – 3:19
"Shadow on the House" – 3:20

1981 Dutch issue
"It Must Be Love"
"Mrs. Hutchinson"

1992 reissue
"It Must Be Love" – 3:19
"Bed and Breakfast Man" – 2:33

Two other UK issues of the Madness version appeared but did not chart. In 1987, "It Must Be Love" was released on the re-issue label Old Gold Records, backed with "My Girl"; and, in 1988 Virgin, Madness released a 7" to coincide with the song's appearance in The Tall Guy, backed with "The Return of the Los Palmas 7".

1992 Virgin reissue
"It Must Be Love" – 3:19
"Bed and Breakfast Man" – 2:33
"Airplane" – 2:59
"Don't Quote Me on That – 4:35

Charts

Weekly charts

Year-end charts

Certifications

Other versions
In 1975, the song was covered by New Seekers singer Lyn Paul.

In 2019, the song was featured on the Children in Need album Got It Covered, performed by Helena Bonham Carter, Jim Broadbent, Olivia Colman, Shaun Dooley, Luke Evans, Suranne Jones, Adrian Lester, Himesh Patel, David Tennant and Jodie Whittaker.

In popular culture
 
The song was featured in the 1989 film The Tall Guy, starring Jeff Goldblum, Rowan Atkinson, and Emma Thompson. Suggs, lead vocalist of Madness, also appeared in the film while singing this song.

In 2011, a cover by Newton Faulkner was featured in a UK advertisement for the Samsung Galaxy S II.
In 2012, a cover by Lotte Mullan was featured in a UK advertisement for LoveFilm.
The song, covered by various artists, including Bruce Heald (of Noise International) and Melanie Horsnell, has been featured in Australian advertisements for Huggies nappies.
In 2017, it was performed by a character in The Lovers, and also featured in the film's trailer.

References

External links
It Must Be Love entry on BBC Radio 2's Sold on Song site

1971 songs
1981 singles
1983 singles
Labi Siffre songs
Madness (band) songs
Songs written by Labi Siffre
Pye Records singles
Stiff Records singles
Virgin Records singles
Song recordings produced by Clive Langer
Song recordings produced by Alan Winstanley